Arroio do Só ("rivulet of the hermit") is a bairro in the District of Arroio do Só in the municipality of Santa Maria, in the Brazilian state of Rio Grande do Sul. It is located in east Santa Maria.

Villages 
The bairro contains the following villages: Água Boa, Alto dos Mários, Arroio do Só, Coitado, Parada João Alberti, Picada do Arenal, Rincão dos Becos, Rincão dos Pires, Rincão Nossa Senhora Aparecida, São Geraldo, Tronqueiras, Vila Arroio do Só and Vila Silva.

References 

Bairros of Santa Maria, Rio Grande do Sul